Baccaurea tetrandra, also known as mata kunau in Malay and more locally as kunau-kunau or enkuni, is a species of flowering plant, a tropical forest fruit-tree in the tampoi family, that is native to Southeast Asia.

Description
The species grows as a dioecious tree to 4–20 m in height, with a short, occasionally fluted, 1–1.5 m bole. The smooth, oval leaves are 5–21 cm long by 2–12 cm wide. The inflorescences of white or green to yellow (sometimes red) flowers occur in the leaf axils and along the branches. The fruits are pink to red berries, with the seeds contained in an edible, blue to purple arillode.

Distribution and habitat
The species is found in Borneo, the Philippines, Sulawesi and the Maluku Islands, where it occurs in lowland and hill mixed dipterocarp, swamp and secondary forests, up to an elevation of 1,500 m. It is sometimes cultivated in villages.

References

tetrandra
Flora of Malesia
Fruits originating in Asia
Plants described in 1858
Taxa named by Henri Ernest Baillon